Li Weijie (born 31 March 2000) is a Chinese footballer currently playing as a goalkeeper for Guangzhou.

Career statistics

Club
.

References

2000 births
Living people
Chinese footballers
China youth international footballers
Association football goalkeepers
China League One players
China League Two players
Guangzhou F.C. players
Shanghai Shenxin F.C. players
21st-century Chinese people